Stavnes Lighthouse or Stavneset Lighthouse is a coastal lighthouse in Averøy Municipality in Møre og Romsdal county, Norway.  The lighthouse sits on the Stavneset peninsula on the northeastern coast of the island Averøya, along the Bremsnesfjorden.  The lighthouse was built to mark the entrance to the fjord, which is near the port of the city of Kristiansund, a few kilometres away.

The lighthouse was originally built in 1842 and it was rebuilt in 1894. The lighthouse was automated in 1976. The light burns from 16 July until 21 May every year, but it does not burn in the summer due to the midnight sun. The lighthouse is painted white with a red top.

See also

Lighthouses in Norway
List of lighthouses in Norway

References

External links

 Norsk Fyrhistorisk Forening 

Lighthouses in Møre og Romsdal
Averøy